AMAG may stand for:

 American Mission for Aid to Greece, Cold War mission established under the Truman Doctrine
 Austria Metall AG, an Austrian metal manufacturer.
 AMAG Automobil- und Motoren AG, a Swiss automobile importer.
 Asian Martial Arts Games
 AMAG Technology, a US manufacturer of access control and video security systems
 AMAG Pharmaceuticals